Benjamin Yeoh (born 1978)  is a British Chinese playwright.

Biography
Born near London, England,  his father came from Ipoh, Malaysia and mother from Singapore. His grandfather, Datuk Yeoh Cheang Lee was the first non-European chairman of the Perak Turf Club, in Ipoh, Malaysia.
Yeoh won a scholarship to Westminster School and went on to study Natural Sciences at Emmanuel College, Cambridge University, the same college as his father and grand father. He then went on to Harvard University as a Herchel Smith scholar studying dramaturgy and play writing.

Yeoh is also among the first generation of writers to have come from the Soho Theatre Young Writers’ Programme. He has also been on the Royal Court Theatre’s writers’ programme led in 2005 by playwright Jane Bodie.

Yeoh has directed several plays and has been involved with writing groups and mentorships such as Royal Court Writers, Soho Young Writers, BBC Radio, Moti Roti, Talawa and Yellow Ink. He sat on the board and then as Chair of Talawa Theatre Company for eight years until 2012.  He (as of 2017 and since 2014) is Chair of the London-based theatre company, Coney. Yeoh's podcast has interviewed playwright Mark Ravenhill, actor Sally Phillips, economist Diane Coyle, philosopher Jonathan Wolff.

Yeoh is known for his sustainable and socially responsible investing work. He won the Thomson Extel Award for Best Sector Sell-side Analyst for Integrated Socially Responsible Investment Analysis in 2003. Yeoh sat on the UK financial regulatory body Financial Reporting Council Investor Advisory group (from 2018) and the Royal London Asset Management Sustainable Investing advisory committee. As of 2021, Yeoh was an associate fellow of Chatham House, Sustainability Accelerator.

Plays

Lemon Love (2001) 

His first play, Lemon Love, was performed by Louie Bayliss and Salima Saxton at the Finborough Theatre, London (2001). Lemon Love is a revenge love story that involved a mystical older couple guiding and berating a younger couple in their stormy relationship.  Directed by Elizabeth Freestone.

Lost in Peru (2003) 

Lost in Peru, was his second full length piece, first performed at the Camden People’s Theatre, London (2003). It was Arts Council of England funded.

The play dealt with torture and interwove personal tragedies with those on a larger scale particularly 'the disappeared' in Latin America. The UK newspaper The Guardian suggested that 'while Yeoh and director Sarah Levinsky should get praise for trying to push the boundaries of form and style, both probably need reminding that there is no point in innovations and performance styles whose tricksiness threaten to bore the audience to death.'

Yellow Gentlemen (2006) 

A reading of his third play called Yellow Men, at the time (2004), was performed at the Soho Theatre and was produced by Yellow Earth Theatre. It also received Arts Council funding.

Yellow Men was renamed Yellow Gentlemen  and performed at the Oval House Theatre in February - March, 2006. Time Out applauded "...the vertiginous sense of possibility and regret present in Yeoh’s intelligent script."

Patent Breaking Life Saving (2006) 

Patent Breaking Life Saving, directed by Jessica Dromgoole was broadcast by BBC World Service in December 2006. It starred Danny Sapani and Tanya Moodie. The play was about an African President who hits his head and starts giving out medicines for free.

The Places In Between (2007) (adaptation) 
The Places in Between, a dramatisation of the book by Rory Stewart, directed by Kirsty Williams and starring Greg Wise was broadcast on BBC Radio 4 on 15 February 2007. The story is about Rory Stewart, who walks across Afghanistan just after the fall of the Taliban.

Nakamitsu (2007) 

Nakamitsu won the international Gate Theatre Translation Award and was performed 24 May - 16 June 2007. It is a version of a Japanese Noh play.

The UK newspaper, the Guardian said of Nakamitsu: ‘Small but exquisitely formed, Benjamin Yeoh's new version of a 14th-century Japanese Noh play is fusion theatre, borrowing from east as well as west. It is both strange and familiar, accessible and remote, restrained and yet somehow full-blown.’

House of Cards (2012 - 14) 

Yeoh wrote the recorded dialogue for Coney's  interactive re-imagining of Kensington Palace's State apartments, called House of Cards.

Thinking Bigly: A Guide to Saving the World (2019 - 2021) 

Yeoh co-wrote, with David Finnigan, and performed Thinking Bigly, a performance-lecture at Theatre Deli, London. and on-line versions. On reviewing, Laura Kressly wrote "Their lecture-performance amalgamates these three topics into an engaging, informative and interactive presentation that gives a wide-angle view on what we can do to save the planet."  

 Yeoh has also had work on BBC Radio 3 (The Inventor of Fireworks performed by David Yip on 22 January 2004)  and several readings of other works.

See also 

 British Chinese
 Overseas Chinese
 List of overseas Chinese
 List of British Chinese people

References

External links 
 Guardian article and interview on Nakamitsu
 BBC radio documentary on British Born Chinese and interview with Benjamin Yeoh
South China Morning Post Profile, "one of the first British Chinese playwrights to be appreciated in Britain"
 Times review of Nakamitsu by Sam Marlowe
 Guardian review of Lost in Peru by Lyn Gardner
 Plays listed at Dollee site
 Website of the play Yellow Gentlemen
 Stage review of Nakamitsu
 Visible Chinese Profile
 Author site

1978 births
Living people
English dramatists and playwrights
Alumni of Emmanuel College, Cambridge
Harvard Graduate School of Arts and Sciences alumni
People educated at Westminster School, London
English people of Chinese descent
English people of Malaysian descent
English people of Singaporean descent
English male dramatists and playwrights